The second Conte government was the 66th government of the Italian Republic and the second government led by Giuseppe Conte. The government was sworn in on 5 September 2019 to 13 February 2021.

The government was supported by the anti-establishment Five Star Movement (M5S) and the centre-left Democratic Party (PD), along with the leftist parliamentary group Free and Equal (LeU). On 17 September 2019 the centrist party Italia Viva (IV), which splintered from the PD on that day, announced its support for the coalition, as well.

The government has been referred to as the "yellow-red government", based on the customary colours of the main supporting parties.

The second Conte government had the lowest average age of its members in the history of the Italian Republic.

On 13 January 2021, after weeks of disagreements within the government coalition, the two ministers of IV resigned from their posts. Having lost the full support of one of the parties forming the government, Prime Minister Conte resigned on 26 January 2021.

Supporting parties

Beginning of term
At the time of the government formation, its ministers and other members were part of the following three parties.

The government also obtained the support of the Associative Movement Italians Abroad (MAIE), and one of its senators, Ricardo Merlo, was appointed as undersecretary in the government. The government received also the external support of the following minor parties: Popular Civic List (CP), the Italian Socialist Party (PSI), Italia in Comune (IiC), the South Tyrolean People's Party (SVP) and the Trentino Tyrolean Autonomist Party (PATT).

2019–2021
From 18 September 2019 to 13 January 2021, the government ministers and other members were from the following four parties.

On 17 September 2020 former Prime Minister Matteo Renzi led a breakaway group outside the PD and formed Italia Viva, which confirmed its support to the government.

End of term
At the time of its resignation, the government ministers and other members were from the following three parties.

On 13 January 2021 former Prime Minister Matteo Renzi announced the withdrawal of his party’s support to the government.

History

Background 

After the 2018 general election the Five Star Movement (M5S), which had come first in the election, and the League agreed to form a coalition government led by Giuseppe Conte, the first Conte government.

In August 2019, Matteo Salvini, Deputy Prime Minister and leader of the League, announced a motion of no confidence against the government, after growing tensions within the majority. Salvini's move came right after a vote in the Senate regarding the progress of the Turin–Lyon high-speed railway, in which the League, along with the largest opposition parties, voted against an attempt of the M5S to block the construction works. Many political analysts believe the no confidence motion was an attempt to force early elections to improve his party's standing in Parliament, due to its increasing support in opinion polls, ensuring Salvini could become the next Prime Minister. On 20 August, following the parliamentary debate in which Conte harshly accused Salvini of being a political opportunist who "had triggered the political crisis only to serve his personal interest", the Prime Minister tendered his resignation to President Sergio Mattarella.

Government formation
On 21 August, Mattarella started consultations with parliamentary groups. On the same day, the national board of the Democratic Party (PD) officially and unanimously opened to the prospect of a government with the M5S, based on pro-Europeanism, green economy, sustainable development, fight against economic inequality and a new immigration policy. However, the talks resulted in a unclear outcome, the President announced a second round of consultations starting on 27 August.

Negotiations between PD and M5S started, while Free and Equal (LeU), a left-wing parliamentary group, announced its support too. On 28 August, PD's leader Nicola Zingaretti announced at the Quirinal Palace his favourable position on forming a new government with the Five Stars with Conte at its head. On same day, Mattarella summoned Conte to the Quirinal Palace for 29 August to give him the task of forming a new government. On 3 September, M5S members voted through the so-called "Rousseau Platform" in favor of an agreement with the PD, with Conte Prime Minister, with more than 79% of the vote out of nearly 80,000 voters.

On 4 September Conte announced the ministers of this new government, which was sworn in on the following day. At its start, the government was composed of 21 ministers, 14 men and 7 women, a majority of whom were from Southern Italy.

Investiture votes 
On 9 September 2019 the Chamber of Deputies approved the government with 343 votes in favour, 263 against and 3 abstentions. On the following day the Senate followed suit, with 169 in favour, 133 against and 5 abstentions.

Italia Viva and M5S crises

In September 2019 former Prime Minister Matteo Renzi lead a split from the PD, and formed a party called Italia Viva. The new party had two ministers (Teresa Bellanova and Elena Bonetti) and one undersecretary, and kept its support for the Conte II government.

In December 2019 the Minister of Education and Research, Lorenzo Fioramonti, resigned after disagreements with the rest of the cabinet regarding the recently approved 2020 budget bill. Fioramonti considered the share of funds dedicated to education and research to be insufficient. For the designation of the new Minister, Prime Minister Conte decided to split the Ministry of Education, University and Research into two. The Ministry of Public Education went to the former undersecretary Lucia Azzolina (M5S), whereas the Ministry of University and Research went to the dean of the University of Naples Federico II, Gaetano Manfredi (Ind).

In January 2020, the Five Star Movement suffered multiple parliamentary defections and a sizeable decrease in popularity with respect to the 2018 elections. Luigi Di Maio resigned from his position as M5S political leader, retaining his position as foreign minister.

Coronavirus outbreak

In February 2020, the COVID-19 pandemic was confirmed to have spread to northern Italian regions. In a few weeks, it spread to the rest of the country, with major concentration of cases in the regions of Lombardy, Emilia-Romagna, Piedmont and Veneto. The government faced the subsequent health crisis by imposing gradually stricter measures of social distancing and quarantine, until a nationwide lockdown was imposed on 9 March, restricting the movement of people except for reasons of necessity, health, or work.

January 2021 political crisis 

On 13 January 2021, after weeks of disagreements between IV and the rest of the government regarding the handling of the Next Generation EU funds, all three cabinet members of IV (Minister of Agriculture Teresa Bellanova, Minister of Family Elena Bonetti and Undersecretary for Economy Ivan Scalfarotto) resigned from their posts.

Having lost the full support of one of the parties forming the government, Prime Minister Conte narrowly won a confidence vote at the Senate with a 156–140 tally, including 16 abstention votes from the IV senators, falling short of the absolute majority of 161 votes.

Due to that, and unable to find enough votes in Parliament to move ahead with the current government, on 26 January 2021 Conte tended his resignations to President Sergio Mattarella, who asked him to stay in office to handle current affairs (as is customary in Italian politics).

Party breakdown

Beginning of term

Ministers

Ministers and other members 
 Five Star Movement (M5S): 9 ministers, 6 deputy ministers, 16 undersecretaries
 Democratic Party (PD): 9 ministers, 4 deputy ministers, 14 undersecretaries
 Free and Equal (LeU): 1 ministers, 2 undersecretaries
 Article One (Art.1): 1 minister, 1 undersecretary  
 Italian Left (SI): 1 undersecretary  
 Associative Movement Italians Abroad (MAIE): 1 undersecretary
 Independents: Prime minister, 2 ministers

2019–2021

Ministers

Ministers and other members 
 Five Star Movement (M5S): 9 ministers, 6 deputy ministers, 15 undersecretaries
 Democratic Party (PD): 7 ministers, 4 deputy ministers, 13 undersecretaries
 Italia Viva (IV): 2 ministers, 1 undersecretary
 Free and Equal (LeU): 1 ministers, 2 undersecretaries
 Article One (Art.1): 1 minister, 1 undersecretary  
 Italian Left (SI): 1 undersecretary  
 Associative Movement Italians Abroad (MAIE): 1 undersecretary
 Independents: Prime minister, 3 ministers

End of term

Ministers

Ministers and other members 
 Five Star Movement (M5S): 9 ministers, 6 deputy ministers, 15 undersecretaries
 Democratic Party (PD): 7 ministers, 4 deputy ministers, 13 undersecretaries
 Free and Equal (LeU): 1 minister, 2 undersecretaries
 Article One (Art.1): 1 minister, 1 undersecretary  
 Italian Left (SI): 1 undersecretary  
 Associative Movement Italians Abroad (MAIE): 1 undersecretary
 Independents: Prime minister, 3 ministers, 1 undersecretary

Geographical breakdown

Beginning of term 

Northern Italy: 8 ministers
Emilia-Romagna: 2 ministers
Lombardy: 2 ministers
Piedmont: 2 ministers
Friuli-Venezia Giulia: 1 minister
Veneto: 1 minister
Central Italy: 2 ministers
Lazio: 2 ministers
Southern and Insular Italy: 12 ministers (including Conte)
Campania: 4 ministers
Apulia: 3 ministers (including Conte)
Sicily: 3 ministers
Basilicata: 2 ministers

2019–2021 
Northern Italy: 8 ministers
Emilia-Romagna: 2 ministers
Lombardy: 2 ministers
Piedmont: 2 ministers
Friuli-Venezia Giulia: 1 minister
Veneto: 1 minister
Central Italy: 1 minister
Lazio: 1 minister
Southern and Insular Italy: 14 ministers (including Conte)
Campania: 5 ministers
Sicily: 4 ministers
Apulia: 3 ministers (including Conte)
Basilicata: 2 ministers

End of term 
Northern Italy: 6 ministers
Piedmont: 2 ministers
Emilia-Romagna: 1 minister
Friuli-Venezia Giulia: 1 minister
Lombardy: 1 minister
Veneto: 1 minister
Central Italy: 1 minister
Lazio: 1 minister
Southern and Insular Italy: 14 ministers (including Conte)
Campania: 5 ministers
Sicily: 4 ministers
Apulia: 3 ministers (including Conte)
Basilicata: 2 ministers

Council of Ministers 
The Council of Ministerswas composed of the following members:

Composition

References

External links 

 
2019 establishments in Italy
Italian governments
Cabinets established in 2019
Giuseppe Conte